Matt Bauder (born 1976) is an American jazz saxophonist, clarinetist and composer. He is the bandleader of the jazz trio Hearing Things, the jazz quintet Day in Pictures, and the modern doo-wop group White Blue Yellow & Clouds. He is a member of the long-form improvisation trio Memorize the Sky, jazz collective Ghost Train Orchestra, and was formerly a member of the touring lineups for Arcade Fire and Iron & Wine.

Early life and education
Bauder was born and raised in Ann Arbor, Michigan. He attended the University of North Texas in Denton, and earned a bachelor of fine arts in jazz and contemporary improvisation at the University of Michigan in Ann Arbor. He lived in Chicago from 1999 to 2001, where he was a part of the city's modern jazz and improvised music scene, and then attended graduate school at Wesleyan University in Middletown, Connecticut. There he studied under Anthony Braxton and received a master's degree in composition. He lived in Berlin for a year, and moved to New York City in 2005.

Career
He followed that up in 2007 with the first album from his long-form improvisational jazz trio Memorize the Sky, featuring Bauder on saxophone, clarinet, bass clarinet and percussion, Zach Wallace on bass, vibraphone and percussion, and Aaron Siegel on drums and percussion. Bauder released two more albums with Memorize the Sky, in 2008 and 2010.

Bauder is the bandleader and plays saxophone and guitar in the jazz trio Hearing Things, with JP Schlegelmilch on organ and Vinnie Sperrazza on drums.

In 2001, Bauder formed the doo-wop jazz group White Blue Yellow & Clouds. He plays saxophone and guitar in the group, and also sings lead vocals on some of the songs. They released Introducing White Blue Yellow & Clouds in 2007. The album features trumpeter Peter Evans, bassist Jason Ajemian, Fred Thomas (of Saturday Looks Good to Me) and sound artist Dan St. Clair. On the album, the band mashes up '50s doo-wop, '60s soul and California pop music with avant-garde flourishes, and includes covers of "God Only Knows" by The Beach Boys, "Lovers Never Say Goodbye" by The Flamingos and "Hushabye" by The Mystics.

Bauder has released two albums with his Brooklyn-based jazz quintet Day in Pictures on Clean Feed Records, the 2010 self-titled debut and 2014's Nightshades, with trumpeter Nate Wooley, pianist Kris Davis, bassist Jason Ajemian and drummer Tomas Fujiwara. Bauder played tenor saxophone and composed the songs on both albums.

In 2014, he joined the Arcade Fire's touring lineup, remaining with the band until 2016. He played saxophone and clarinet on two tracks on Arcade Fire member Will Butler's 2015 debut album Policy. He has also toured with Iron & Wine, played in the Broadway production of Fela! and collaborated on numerous projects with performance artist Aki Sasamoto, including the 2012 installation Centripetal Run, for which Bauder played saxophone, drums and guitar, sometimes simultaneously. Bauder regularly performs with Harris Eisenstadt's quintet Canada Day, and has also appeared on recordings by the Exploding Star Orchestra, Taylor Ho Bynum, Anthony Braxton, Rob Mazurek and Harris Eisenstadt.

Discography

Albums

Extended plays

Singles

Appears on

References

1976 births
Living people
American jazz saxophonists
American jazz clarinetists
Musicians from Ann Arbor, Michigan
Wesleyan University alumni
University of Michigan School of Music, Theatre & Dance alumni
University of North Texas alumni
21st-century clarinetists
Ghost Train Orchestra members
Clean Feed Records artists
Locust Music artists